Class 442 may refer to:

British Rail Class 442
New South Wales 442 class locomotive